Rear-Admiral Cecil Robert Peter Charles Branson CBE (30 March 1924 – 1 January 2011), known as Peter Branson, was a Royal Navy officer who was Assistant Chief of Naval Staff (Operations) from 1975 until 1977.

Born in Saint-Malo, France, Cecil Robert Peter Charles Branson grew up speaking fluent French and English. He had the rare distinction of being twice torpedoed while under training with the Royal Navy. In 1956, he was given command of the anti-submarine frigate HMS Roebuck and later given command of HMS Rooke, the naval base at Gibraltar. He retired from the Navy in 1977.

Family
Peter Branson married Sonia Moss in 1945; she died in 2010. They had one child, a daughter.

References

1924 births
2011 deaths
Place of death missing
Commanders of the Order of the British Empire
Royal Navy rear admirals
Royal Navy submariners
Royal Navy personnel of World War II